
Gmina Ruciane-Nida is an urban-rural gmina (administrative district) in Pisz County, Warmian-Masurian Voivodeship, in northern Poland.

The gmina contains part of the protected area called Masurian Landscape Park.

Villages
Apart from the town of Ruciane-Nida, Gmina Ruciane-Nida contains the villages and settlements of Bartlewo, Borek, Gałkowo, Gąsior, Głodowo, Iwanowo, Iznota, Jeleń, Kadzidłowo, Kamień, Karwica, Karwica Mazurska, Kokoszka, Końcewo, Krzyże, Ładne Pole, Lipnik, Lisiczyn, Majdan, Maskulińskie, Niedźwiedzi Róg, Nowa Ukta, Oko, Onufryjewo, Osiniak-Piotrowo, Piaski, Pieczysko, Popielno, Pranie, Ruczaj, Śwignajno, Śwignajno Wielkie, Szeroki Bór, Ukta, Warnowo, Wejsuny, Wejsuny-Leśniczówka, Wierzba, Wojnowo, Wólka, Wygryny, Wypad, Zameczek, Zamordeje, Zaroślak and Zdrużno.

Neighbouring gminas
Gmina Ruciane-Nida is bordered by the gminas of Mikołajki, Piecki, Pisz, Rozogi and Świętajno.

References
Polish official population figures 2006

Ruciane-Nida
Gmina Ruciane Nida